Edward Thomas "Dee" Cousineau (December 16, 1898 – July 14, 1951) was a professional baseball player. He played in five games in Major League Baseball for the Boston Braves over three seasons: one in 1923, three in 1924, and one in 1925, all as a catcher. In 1923, he went 2-for-2 at the plate for a 1.000 batting average, but in 1924 he went 0-for-2 to bring his career average to .500.

External links 

Major League Baseball catchers
Boston Braves players
Waterbury Brasscos players
Worcester Panthers players
Albany Senators players
Scranton Miners players
Memphis Chickasaws players
Mobile Bears players
Hattiesburg Pinetoppers players
Baton Rouge Essos players
Fordham Rams baseball players
Baseball players from Massachusetts
People from Watertown, Massachusetts
Sportspeople from Middlesex County, Massachusetts
1898 births
1951 deaths